Coremecis is a genus of moths in the family Geometridae.

Species
 Coremecis incursaria (Walker, 1860)
 Coremecis maculata (Warren, 1899)

References
 Coremecis at Markku Savela's Lepidoptera and Some Other Life Forms
 Natural History Museum Lepidoptera genus database

Boarmiini